The Gambat Liver Transplant Center (also Gambat Organ Transplant Unit) is a public hospital located in Gambat City, Pakistan. It is funded by the Government of Sindh, one of four Provincial Governments of Pakistan. Its transplant program offers free liver transplants to those who cannot generate the money to pay for the treatment.

Started in 2016, the 50-bed facility was the first Pakistani hospital to perform both a kidney transplant and a liver transplant in the same surgery.

In 2020, the hospital performed 210 living-donor liver transplants, the highest number ever recorded in Pakistan. Until January 2021, Gambat Liver Transplant Unit carried out 330 liver transplants and 102 kidney transplants during the period by a team of nine surgeons. Its out-patient clinic has been catering to as many as 250 patients. It is currently the only public sector transplant unit in Pakistan that performs 6 living donor liver transplantations and 3 kidney transplantations per week.

References 

Hospitals in Pakistan
Transplant organizations
2016 establishments in Pakistan
Hospitals established in 2016